Benalla Airport  is located 1 km east of Benalla, Victoria, Australia. Benalla Airport is the home of the Gliding Club of Victoria.

The airport was opened in 1941, as one of the many training bases in southern Australia supporting the commitment of the Royal Australian Air Force (RAAF) to the Empire Air Training Scheme, and the No. 11 Elementary Flying School was based there between 1941 and 1945.

See also
 List of airports in Victoria

References

Airports in Victoria (Australia)